Ukuwela Divisional Secretariat is a  Divisional Secretariat  of Matale District, of Central Province, Sri Lanka.

References
 Divisional Secretariats Portal

Divisional Secretariats of Matale District
Geography of Matale District